Harold Edward Welsh (May 5, 1896 – May 20, 1943) was a politician in Ontario, Canada. He was a Progressive Conservative member of the Legislative Assembly of Ontario from 1936 to 1943 who represented the eastern Ontario riding of Hastings East.

Background
The son of William Frederick Welsh and Caroline Mabel Oatwater, he was born in Moira, Ontario and was educated at the University of Toronto. He worked as a country doctor, living in Roslin and also served as coroner for Hastings County and as medical officer of health for Huntingdon, Thurlow and Tyendinaga townships.

Politics
Welsh was elected to the assembly in 1936, defeating Liberal candidate Dr. Harold A. Boyce in a bitterly contested by-election held following the death of James Ferguson Hill. Liberal amendments altering the distribution of school taxes between public and Roman Catholic schools were a crucial issue in the by-election. Welsh died in office; he drowned while fishing in Algonquin Provincial Park.

References

External links
 

1890s births
1964 deaths
Progressive Conservative Party of Ontario MPPs
Deaths by drowning in Canada
Accidental deaths in Ontario
Canadian coroners